The first USS Buck (SP-1355), later USS SP-1355, was a tender that served in the United States Navy from 1917 to 1918.
 
Buck was built as a civilian motorboat in 1911. On 24 August 1917, the U.S. Navy acquired her under a free lease from the Conservation Commission of Maryland for use during World War I. She was commissioned as USS Buck (SP-1355) on 13 September 1917.

Assigned to the 5th Naval District, Buck served as a tender at Norfolk, Virginia, for the remainder of World War I. She was renamed USS SP-1355 in April 1918.

SP-1355 was decommissioned late in 1918. The navy returned her to Conservation Commission of Maryland on either 24 September 1918 or 27 November 1918.

Notes

References

Department of the Navy Naval History and Heritage Command Online Library of Selected Images: U.S. Navy Ships: USS Buck (SP-1355), 1917-1918. Renamed SP-1355 in 1918
NavSource Online: Section Patrol Craft Photo Archive: Buck (SP 1355)

Maritime history of Maryland
Chesapeake Bay boats
Auxiliary ships of the United States Navy
World War I auxiliary ships of the United States
1911 ships